Carlos Delgado Altieri (born January 9, 1960) is a Puerto Rican politician who served as the mayor of Isabela from 2001 to 2021. He has also served as the president of the Popular Democratic Party since August 20, 2020. He was the Popular Democratic Party nominee for Governor of Puerto Rico in 2020, losing to New Progressive Pedro Pierluisi.

Early life and education 
Born in Lares, Puerto Rico, he obtained a Bachelor of Business Administration with a concentration in marketing from the University of Puerto Rico.

Career 

He is the Popular Democratic Party's nominee for Governor of Puerto Rico in the 2020 elections, after defeating San Juan Mayor Carmen Yulín Cruz and Senator Eduardo Bhatia in the primaries. He faced Pedro Pierluisi (PNP), Juan Dalmau (PIP), César Vázquez (PD), Alexandra Lúgaro (MVC), and Eliezer Molina (IND) in the general elections of November 3, 2020. He lost the gubernatorial race to Pedro Pierluisi (PNP)

References

 
|-

|-

1960 births
Living people
Mayors of places in Puerto Rico
People from Isabela, Puerto Rico
People from Lares, Puerto Rico
Popular Democratic Party (Puerto Rico) politicians
Puerto Rican party leaders
University of Puerto Rico alumni